Merolonche is a genus of moths of the family Noctuidae. The genus was erected by Augustus Radcliffe Grote in 1882.

Species
Merolonche australis Mustelin & Leuschner, 2000 California
Merolonche dolli Barnes & McDunnough, 1918 New York
Merolonche lupini (Grote, 1873) California, Colorado, British Columbia
Merolonche spinea (Grote, 1876) California

References

Acronictinae